The Hagerstown Multi-Use Sports and Events Facility is a multi-purpose stadium under construction in Hagerstown, Maryland.

The planned 5,000-seat facility is being built primarily for the Hagerstown ALPB Team, a future team in the Atlantic League of Professional Baseball, but it is also intended to host other sports, outdoor concerts, festivals and community events.

The Maryland Stadium Authority is overseeing development of the facility. Turner Construction is designing and building it. Upon completion, it will be owned and operated by the Hagerstown-Washington County Industrial Foundation (CHIEF).

The $69.5 million development budget mostly comes from $59.5 million in bonds issued by the stadium authority which will be paid off with lottery proceeds. Then-Maryland governor Larry Hogan budgeted another $8.5 million for the project and the Maryland General Assembly earmarked $1.5 million in its capital budget.

A groundbreaking ceremony was held on October 18, 2022. The facility is expected to be ready for use in 2024.

References

External links
 Atlantic League of Professional Baseball

2023 establishments in Maryland
Atlantic League of Professional Baseball ballparks
Baseball venues in Maryland
Buildings and structures in Hagerstown, Maryland
Hagerstown, Maryland
Sports in Hagerstown, Maryland
Sports venues completed in 2023
Tourist attractions in Hagerstown, Maryland